The Orkney tunnel is a suggested undersea road tunnel between Orkney and Caithness on the Scottish Mainland. The expected length of it would be about 9–10 miles (15–16 km).

The tunnel, if constructed, is assumed to make landfall on South Ronaldsay. In 2005, the tunnel was discussed, and then a total bill of £100 million was mentioned. There has not been so much discussion after 2005.

There are also suggested plans to connect Orkney Mainland to Shapinsay.

With recent developments of the renewables industry in the Pentland Firth, the idea of a tunnel has lost ground, though there have been discussions of the construction of a bridge over the top of a Pentland Tidal Array.

References

Orkney
Buildings and structures in Caithness
Tunnels in Scotland
Proposed undersea tunnels in Europe
Northern Isles
Proposed transport infrastructure in Scotland
Proposed_railway_lines_in_Scotland